The men's 400 metres hurdles event at the 1948 Summer Olympic Games took place July 30 and July 31. There were 25 competitors from 17 nations. The maximum number of athletes per nation had been set at 3 since the 1930 Olympic Congress. The final was won by American Roy Cochran. It was the nation's second consecutive and seventh overall victory in the event. Duncan White won Ceylon's first Olympic medal in any event with his silver. As of the 2016 Games, it remains the only medal won by a male competitor from Ceylon/Sri Lanka; the nation has won one other medal, Susanthika Jayasinghe's silver in the 2000 women's 200 metres. Sweden's first medal in the men's 400 metres hurdles was won by Rune Larsson, taking bronze.

Background

This was the ninth time the event was held. It had been introduced along with the men's 200 metres hurdles in 1900, with the 200 being dropped after 1904 and the 400 being held through 1908 before being left off the 1912 programme. However, when the Olympics returned in 1920 after World War I, the men's 400 metres hurdles was back and would continue to be contested at every Games thereafter.

None of the six finalists from the pre-war 1936 Games returned. The favorite was Roy Cochran of the United States, the world record holder in the 440 yards version of the event.

Ceylon, the Republic of China, Colombia, New Zealand, Pakistan, Switzerland, and Turkey each made their debut in the event. The United States made its ninth appearance, the only nation to have competed at every edition of the event to that point.

Summary
Rune Larsson improved the Olympic Record by a tenth of a second in the first semi-final, chased by Dick Ault and Duncan White.  In the second semi, Roy Cochran equalled Larsson's record.  With qualification exclusively based on place, Jean-Claude Arifon ran a full second faster than Ottavio Missoni but was fourth in the fast first semi and had to watch the final.

From the gun, Cochran and White went out aggressively, Cochran making up the stagger on Ault to his outside before the second hurdle and White catching Larsson to his outside about the third.  With the challenge, Ault stayed with his teammate Cochran into the second turn, even gaining some of the lost ground until Cochran accelerated coming off the seventh hurdle, putting a gap on Ault.  As the staggers evened, Ault was challenging White for second place while Cochran had a clear lead.  With the lead, Cochran continued to expand the gap, taking the tenth hurdle cautiously then pulling away to the finish.  Behind him, Ault chopped his step going in to the ninth hurdle, losing his momentum and second place to White.  Larsson pushed hard coming off the ninth, going past Ault and trying to catch White.

Competition format

The competition featured the three-round format introduced in 1908: quarterfinals, semifinals, and a final. Ten sets of hurdles were set on the course. The hurdles were 3 feet (91.5 centimetres) tall and were placed 35 metres apart beginning 45 metres from the starting line, resulting in a 40 metres home stretch after the last hurdle. The 400 metres track was standard.

There were 6 quarterfinal heats, with between 4 and 5 athletes each. The top 2 men in each quarterfinal advanced to the semifinals. The 12 semifinalists were divided into 2 semifinals of 6 athletes each, with the top 3 in each semifinal advancing to the 6-man final.

Records

Prior to the competition, the existing world and Olympic records were as follows.

Rune Larsson bettered the Olympic record with a time of 51.9 seconds in the first semifinal. Roy Cochran matched that time in the second semifinal, then dropped 0.8 seconds off it for a new record of 51.1 seconds in the final.

Schedule

All times are British Summer Time (UTC+1).

Results

Quarterfinals

The first round was held on 30 July. The two fastest runners from each heat qualified to the semifinals.

Quarterfinal 1

Quarterfinal 2

Quarterfinal 3

Quarterfinal 4

Quarterfinal 5

Quarterfinal 6

Semifinals

The semifinals were held on 30 July. The three fastest runners from each heat advanced to the final.

Semifinal 1

Semifinal 2

Final

Results summary

References

External links
Organising Committee for the XIV Olympiad, The (1948). The Official Report of the Organising Committee for the XIV Olympiad. LA84 Foundation. Retrieved 5 September 2016.

Athletics at the 1948 Summer Olympics
400 metres hurdles at the Olympics
Men's events at the 1948 Summer Olympics